Dai Xiangyu, previously known as Dai Yangtian, is a Chinese actor and model formerly based in Singapore. He was a prominently a full-time Mediacorp artiste from 2007 to 2013.

Career
Dai was born in Shaoxing, Zhejiang province in 1984. He did some modeling in Japan and Shanghai. While in Shanghai he was talent-spotted by MediaCorp and moved to Singapore to sign the contract. His big break came in 2008 when he played Yamamoto Yousuke, a Japanese photographer, in the blockbuster series The Little Nyonya and earned a nomination for the Best Supporting Actor at the 2009 Star Awards. This role was supposed to go to Elvin Ng who was injured just before filming.

Dai acted the first time with Elvin Ng in Together and second time in No Limits. Dai acted his first antagonist role in Breakout. This is the third time Dai acted with Elvin Ng. Then, 8 Days touted them as the male version  of Zoe Tay and Fann Wong. They appeared together in several cover page of 8 Days  and I magazine.

In 2011, Dai moved back to Shanghai, China and film a co-production drama Precious. He played Ling Zhi Chu in Precious. Qi Yuwu replaced him, who was originally selected to play the role of Mo Li Guang, as the male lead in the drama series A Song to Remember.

In 2012, Dai acted in Poetic Justice.

In 2014, Dai signed on with Chinese artiste management agency Mango Entertainment.

As of 29 July 2013, Dai officially changed his name from Dai Yangtian to Dai Xiangyu. After his departure, Romeo Tan replaced him, who was originally selected to play the role of Hong Khee Leong, as the male lead in the drama series Sudden.

In 2019, he did  the remake of Singapore’s most successful TV drama series ever, reprising the same role that shot him to fame in The Little Nyonya with casts Xiang Yun & Jeffrey Xu.

Personal life
In 2009, Dai applied for Singapore Permanent Resident (PR) status but failed due to his academic certificates and birth certificate are not translated to English. He successfully became a Singapore PR in 2014 but lost the status in 2021 after he failed to renew his Re-Entry Permit in time.

Dai married actress Chen Zihan at Beijing on 19 May 2016.

Filmography

Television

Film

Accolades

References

External links
Profile on xin.msn.com

Living people
1984 births
Male actors from Shanghai
21st-century Chinese male actors
Chinese male film actors
Chinese male television actors

Facebook 

Weibo